Gunma 5th district is a constituency of the House of Representatives in the Diet of Japan (national legislature). It is located in Gunma Prefecture and consists of the cities of Tomioka, Annaka, parts of Takasaki and Shibukawa as well as the Kitagunma, Kanra and Agatsuma districts. As of 2012, 315,747 eligible voters were registered in the district.

Gunma, home to the families of prime ministers Fukuda, Nakasone and Obuchi, is considered a "conservative kingdom" (hoshu-ōkoku), a stronghold of the Liberal Democratic Party (LDP). The 5th district has been represented by Keizō Obuchi and his daughter Yūko Obuchi since its creation in 1996. Previously Obuchi and his father Mitsuhei (first elected in 1949) had represented the four-member 3rd district of Gunma.

List of representatives

Election results

References 

Districts of the House of Representatives (Japan)
Gunma Prefecture